The 2020–21 Houston Rockets season was the 54th season of the franchise in the National Basketball Association (NBA), their 50th anniversary season in the Houston area in Texas since the team franchise relocated from the San Diego area in California and their 4th season under owner Tilman Fertitta.

On September 13, Mike D'Antoni informed the Rockets that he would not return as head coach after coaching the team for four seasons. On October 30, the Rockets hired Stephen Silas as their new head coach. On October 15, Daryl Morey resigned from his position as general manager after thirteen years and Rafael Stone was named as his replacement. For the first time since 2011–12, James Harden was not on the roster as he was traded to the Brooklyn Nets in a four-team deal; this reunited him with former Oklahoma City Thunder teammate Kevin Durant for the first time since the 2011–12 season.

Without Harden along with Russell Westbrook, who was traded to the Washington Wizards for John Wall during the offseason and the majority of their players lost from last season’s team, the Rockets entered a rebuilding period. They got off to an 11–10 start as of February 4th, 2021, but their season was marked with an franchise–worst 20–game losing streak between early–February through mid–March, which tied for the ninth longest losing streak in NBA history and the longest since the record–setting 28–game losing streak from the Philadelphia 76ers between the late 2014–15 season and the early 2015–16 season.

By April 22, the Rockets were officially eliminated from playoff contention for the first time since the 2011–12 lockout season. This ended the NBA's longest active playoff streak at eight straight years. The Rockets finished the season at the bottom of the league with a record of 17–55, the third–worst season record in franchise history and their worst season since the dreadful 14–68 record from the 1982–83 season. This season also marked the first time since the 34–48 record from the 2005–06 season that they have suffered a losing record, ending a streak of 15 straight years of finishing a season .500 or above.

Draft

The Rockets did not hold any picks for the 2020 NBA draft. This was the fourth time in franchise history that they did not hold any picks in the draft; the last time was in 2019.

Roster

Standings

Division

Conference

Notes
 z – Clinched home court advantage for the entire playoffs
 y – Clinched division title
 x – Clinched playoff spot
 * – Division leader

Game log

Preseason 

|-style="background:#cfc;"
| 1
| December 11
| @ Chicago
| 
| Bruno Caboclo (17)
| Bruno Caboclo (7)
| John Wall (9)
| United Center
| 1–0
|-style="background:#fcc;"
| 2
| December 13
| @ Chicago
| 
| John Wall (21)
| DeMarcus Cousins (6)
| John Wall (4)
| United Center
| 1–1
|-style="background:#cfc;"
| 3
| December 15
| San Antonio
| 
| John Wall (15)
| DeMarcus Cousins (11)
| James Harden (4)
| Toyota Center
| 2–1
|-style="background:#cfc;"
| 4
| December 17
| San Antonio
| 
| Christian Wood (27)
| Christian Wood (10)
| James Harden (9)
| Toyota Center
| 3–1

Regular season

|-style="background:#cccc;"
| –
| December 23
| Oklahoma City
| colspan="6" | Postponed (COVID-19) (Makeup date: March 21)
|-style="background:#fcc;"
| 1
| December 26
| @ Portland
| 
| James Harden (44)
| Christian Wood (13)
| James Harden (17)
| Moda Center0
| 0–1
|-style="background:#fcc;"
| 2
| December 28
| @ Denver
| 
| James Harden (34)
| Jae'Sean Tate (7)
| James Harden (8)
| Ball Arena0
| 0–2
|-style="background:#cfc;"
| 3
| December 31
| Sacramento
| 
| James Harden (33)
| Christian Wood (12)
| John Wall (9)
| Toyota Center0
| 1–2

|-style="background:#cfc;"
| 4
| January 2
| Sacramento
| 
| John Wall (28)
| Christian Wood (15)
| John Wall (6)
| Toyota Center0
| 2–2
|-style="background:#fcc;"
| 5
| January 4
| Dallas
| 
| Christian Wood (23)
| Christian Wood (7)
| James Harden (10)
| Toyota Center0
| 2–3
|-style="background:#fcc;"
| 6
| January 6
| @ Indiana
| 
| John Wall (28)
| DeMarcus Cousins (14)
| James Harden (12)
| Bankers Life Fieldhouse0
| 2–4
|-style="background:#cfc;"
| 7
| January 8
| Orlando
| 
| Christian Wood (22)
| Christian Wood (15)
| James Harden (13)
| Toyota Center0
| 3–4
|-style="background:#fcc;"
| 8
| January 10
| L. A. Lakers
| 
| Christian Wood (23)
| John Wall (10)
| James Harden (9)
| Toyota Center0
| 3–5
|-style="background:#fcc;"
| 9
| January 12
| L. A. Lakers
| 
| Christian Wood (18)
| DeMarcus Cousins (10)
| James Harden (7)
| Toyota Center0
| 3–6
|-style="background:#cfc;"
| 10
| January 14
| @ San Antonio
| 
| Christian Wood (27)
| Christian Wood (15)
| Jae'Sean Tate (10)
| AT&T Center0
| 4–6
|-style="background:#fcc;"
| 11
| January 16
| @ San Antonio
| 
| Jones, Wood (24)
| Christian Wood (18)
| Jae'Sean Tate (5)
| AT&T Center0
| 4–7
|-style="background:#fcc;"
| 12
| January 18
| @ Chicago
| 
| Victor Oladipo (32)
| Christian Wood (9)
| Victor Oladipo (9)
| United Center0
| 4–8
|-style="background:#fcc;"
| 13
| January 20
| Phoenix
| 
| Gordon, Oladipo (22)
| Christian Wood (11)
| Victor Oladipo (6)
| Toyota Center0
| 4–9
|-style="background:#cfc;"
| 14
| January 22
| @ Detroit
| 
| Eric Gordon (20)
| DeMarcus Cousins (15)
| DeMarcus Cousins (7)
| Little Caesars Arena0
| 5–9
|-style="background:#cfc;"
| 15
| January 23
| @ Dallas
| 
| Eric Gordon (33)
| DeMarcus Cousins (17)
| John Wall (8)
| American Airlines Center0
| 6–9
|-style="background:#cfc;"
| 16
| January 26
| @ Washington
| 
| John Wall (24)
| DeMarcus Cousins (11)
| John Wall (5)
| Toyota Center2,996
| 7–9
|-style="background:#cfc;"
| 17
| January 28
| Portland
| 
| Victor Oladipo (25)
| Christian Wood (12)
| John Wall (6)
| Toyota Center3,154
| 8–9
|-style="background:#cfc;"
| 18
| January 30
| @ New Orleans
| 
| Christian Wood (27)
| Tate, Wood (9)
| John Wall (9)
| Smoothie King Center1,440
| 9–9

|-style="background:#cfc;"
| 19
| February 1
| @ Oklahoma City
| 
| Eric Gordon (25)
| Christian Wood (11)
| Victor Oladipo (7)
| Chesapeake Energy Arena0
| 10–9
|-style="background:#fcc;"
| 20
| February 3
| @ Oklahoma City
| 
| Eric Gordon (22)
| Brown, Wood (6)
| Eric Gordon (4)
| Chesapeake Energy Arena0
| 10–10
|-style="background:#cfc;"
| 21
| February 4
| @ Memphis
| 
| John Wall (22)
| P. J. Tucker (8)
| John Wall (8)
| FedExForum0
| 11–10
|-style="background:#fcc;"
| 22
| February 6
| San Antonio
| 
| John Wall (27)
| DeMarcus Cousins (11)
| Victor Oladipo (5)
| Toyota Center0
| 11–11
|-style="background:#fcc;"
| 23
| February 8
| @ Charlotte
| 
| Victor Oladipo (21)
| DeMarcus Cousins (9)
| Victor Oladipo (6)
| Spectrum Center0
| 11–12
|-style="background:#fcc;"
| 24
| February 9
| @ New Orleans
| 
| John Wall (25)
| Cousins, Tate (7)
| John Wall (6)
| Smoothie King Center1,900
| 11–13
|-style="background:#fcc;"
| 25
| February 11
| Miami
| 
| Gordon, Wall (17)
| DeMarcus Cousins (11)
| John Wall (7)
| Toyota Center3,251
| 11–14
|-style="background:#fcc;"
| 26
| February 13
| @ New York
| 
| John Wall (26)
| DeMarcus Cousins (10)
| Eric Gordon (6)
| Madison Square Garden0
| 11–15
|-style="background:#fcc;"
| 27
| February 15
| @ Washington
| 
| John Wall (29)
| David Nwaba (11)
| John Wall (11)
| Capital One Arena0
| 11–16
|-style="background:#fcc;"
| 28
| February 17
| @ Philadelphia
| 
| John Wall (28)
| David Nwaba (10)
| Eric Gordon (6)
| Wells Fargo Center0
| 11–17
|-style="background:#cccc;"
| –
| February 19
| Dallas
| colspan="6" | Postponed (winter storm) (Makeup date: April 7)
|-style="background:#cccc;"
| –
| February 20
| Indiana
| colspan="6" | Postponed (winter storm) (Makeup date: April 14)
|-style="background:#fcc;"
| 29
| February 22
| Chicago
| 
| David Nwaba (22)
| David Nwaba (9)
| John Wall (7)
| Toyota Center3,025
| 11–18
|-style="background:#fcc;"
| 30
| February 24
| @ Cleveland
| 
| John Wall (20)
| Tate, Tucker (7)
| Victor Oladipo (5)
| Rocket Mortgage FieldHouse2,720
| 11–19
|-style="background:#fcc;"
| 31
| February 26
| @ Toronto
| 
| Victor Oladipo (27)
| Sterling Brown (10)
| John Wall (12)
| Amalie Arena0
| 11–20
|-style="background:#fcc;"
| 32
| February 28
| Memphis
| 
| Tate, Wall (14)
| Sterling Brown (6)
| Sterling Brown (3)
| Toyota Center3,284
| 11–21

|-style="background:#fcc"
| 33
| March 1
| Cleveland
| 
| John Wall (32)
| Justin Patton (6)
| John Wall (5)
| Toyota Center3,046
| 11–22
|-style="background:#fcc"
| 34
| March 3
| Brooklyn
| 
| John Wall (36)
| Jae'Sean Tate (10)
| Oladipo, Wall (5)
| Toyota Center3,615
| 11–23
|-style="background:#fcc;"
| 35
| March 11
| @ Sacramento
| 
| Victor Oladipo (23)
| Sterling Brown (10)
| Kevin Porter Jr. (10)
| Golden 1 Center0
| 11–24
|-style="background:#fcc;"
| 36
| March 12
| @ Utah
| 
| Kevin Porter Jr. (27)
| Kenyon Martin Jr. (10)
| Kevin Porter Jr. (8)
| Vivint Arena5,546
| 11–25
|-style="background:#fcc;"
| 37
| March 14
| Boston
| 
| Victor Oladipo (26)
| David Nwaba (7)
| Kevin Porter Jr. (7)
| Toyota Center3,264
| 11–26
|-style="background:#fcc;"
| 38
| March 16
| Atlanta
| 
| Victor Oladipo (34)
| Sterling Brown (11)
| Kevin Porter Jr. (8)
| Toyota Center3,069
| 11–27
|-style="background:#fcc;"
| 39
| March 17
| Golden State
| 
| Kevin Porter Jr. (25)
| Lamb, Martin Jr., Wood (9)
| Kevin Porter Jr. (7)
| Toyota Center3,259
| 11–28
|-style="background:#fcc;"
| 40
| March 19
| Detroit
| 
| John Wall (21)
| Christian Wood (11)
| John Wall (7)
| Toyota Center3,061
| 11–29
|-style="background:#fcc;"
| 41
| March 21
| Oklahoma City
| 
| Christian Wood (27)
| Jae'Sean Tate (9)
| John Wall (7)
| Toyota Center3,297
| 11–30
|-style="background:#cfc;"
| 42
| March 22
| Toronto
| 
| Jae'Sean Tate (22)
| John Wall (11)
| John Wall (10)
| Toyota Center2,965
| 12–30
|-style="background:#fcc;"
| 43
| March 24
| Charlotte
| 
| John Wall (20)
| Christian Wood (10)
| Wall, Augustin (7)
| Toyota Center3,163
| 12–31
|-style="background:#fcc;"
| 44
| March 26
| @ Minnesota
| 
| Christian Wood (24)
| Sterling Brown (11)
| John Wall (15)
| Target Center0
| 12–32
|-style="background:#cfc;"
| 45
| March 27
| @ Minnesota
| 
| Kevin Porter Jr. (25)
| Jae'Sean Tate (9)
| John Wall (12)
| Target Center0
| 13–32
|-style="background:#fcc;"
| 46
| March 29
| Memphis
| 
| Kelly Olynyk (25)
| Kelly Olynyk (9)
| John Wall (8)
| Toyota Center3,319
| 13–33
|-style="background:#fcc;"
| 47
| March 31
| @ Brooklyn
| 
| Kevin Porter Jr. (20)
| Christian Wood (8)
| Kevin Porter Jr. (6)
| Barclays Center1,773
| 13–34

|-style="background:#fcc;"
| 48
| April 2
| @ Boston
| 
| Christian Wood (19)
| Christian Wood (10)
| Kevin Porter Jr. (8)
| TD Garden0
| 13–35
|-style="background:#fcc;"
| 49
| April 4
| New Orleans
| 
| Kelly Olynyk (26)
| Christian Wood (12)
| Augustin, Porter Jr. (5)
| Toyota Center3,268
| 13–36
|-style="background:#fcc;"
| 50
| April 5
| Phoenix
| 
| Christian Wood (23)
| Kevin Porter Jr. (9)
| Kevin Porter Jr. (8)
| Toyota Center3,093
| 13–37
|-style="background:#cfc;"
| 51
| April 7
| Dallas
| 
| John Wall (31)
| Kelly Olynyk (18)
| John Wall (7)
| Toyota Center3,399
| 14–37
|-style="background:#fcc;"
| 52
| April 9
| @ L. A. Clippers
| 
| Christian Wood (23)
| Kelly Olynyk (11)
| Kevin Porter Jr. (13)
| Staples Center0
| 14–38
|-style="background:#fcc;"
| 53
| April 10
| @ Golden State
| 
| John Wall (30)
| Tate, Olynyk (11)
| John Wall (7)
| Chase Center0
| 14–39
|-style="background:#fcc;"
| 54
| April 12
| @ Phoenix
| 
| Christian Wood (25)
| Christian Wood (15)
| Kevin Porter Jr. (14)
| Phoenix Suns Arena4,145
| 14–40
|-style="background:#fcc;"
| 55
| April 14
| Indiana
| 
| John Wall (31)
| Christian Wood (13)
| John Wall (9)
| Toyota Center3,293
| 14–41
|-style="background:#fcc;"
| 56
| April 16
| Denver
| 
| Kelly Olynyk (23)
| Kenyon Martin Jr. (7)
| Kevin Porter Jr. (5)
| Toyota Center3,342
| 14–42
|-style="background:#cfc;"
| 57
| April 18
| @ Orlando
| 
| Christian Wood (25)
| Christian Wood (10)
| Kevin Porter Jr. (7)
| Toyota Center3,772
| 15–42
|-style="background:#fcc;"
| 58
| April 19
| @ Miami
| 
| Porter Jr., Wood (18)
| Kelly Olynyk (8)
| John Wall (6)
| American Airlines Arena0
| 15–43
|-style="background:#fcc;"
| 59
| April 21
| Utah
| 
| John Wall (21)
| Armoni Brooks (10)
| John Wall (6)
| Toyota Center3,253
| 15–44
|-style="background:#fcc;"
| 60
| April 23
| L. A. Clippers
| 
| John Wall (27)
| Christian Wood (19)
| John Wall (13)
| Toyota Center3,313
| 15–45
|-style="background:#fcc;"
| 61
| April 24
| @ Denver
| 
| D.J. Wilson  (25)
| Olynyk, Wilson (8)
| Kelly Olynyk (11)
| Ball Arena4,035
| 15–46
|-style="background:#fcc;"
| 62
| April 27
| Minnesota
| 
| Kelly Olynyk (28)
| Christian Wood (18)
| Olynyk, Porter Jr., Wood (5)
| Toyota Center3,225
| 15–47
|-style="background:#cfc"
| 63
| April 29
| Milwaukee
| 
| Kevin Porter Jr. (50)
| Kelly Olynyk  (13)
| Kevin Porter Jr. (11)
| Toyota Center3,232
| 16–47

|-style="background:#fcc;"
| 64
| May 1
| Golden State
| 
| Martin Jr., Porter Jr. (16)
| Martin Jr., Olynyk (9)
| Kevin Porter Jr. (6)
| Toyota Center3,702
| 16–48
|-style="background:#fcc;"
| 65
| May 2
| New York
| 
| Christian Wood (19)
| Kelly Olynyk (10)
| Kelly Olynyk (7)
| Toyota Center3,431
| 16–49
|-style="background:#fcc;"
| 66
| May 5
| Philadelphia
| 
| Kelly Olynyk (27)
| Kelly Olynyk (11)
| Kelly Olynyk (8)
| Toyota Center3,583
| 16–50
|-style="background:#fcc"
| 67
| May 7
| @ Milwaukee
| 
| Kenyon Martin Jr. (26)
| Kelly Olynyk (12)
| House Jr., Martin Jr., Olynyk (7)
| Fiserv Forum3,280
| 16–51
|-style="background:#fcc;"
| 68
| May 8
| @ Utah
| 
| Martin Jr., Thomas (27)
| Kenyon Martin Jr. (10)
| Jae'Sean Tate (10)
| Vivint Arena6,506
| 16–52
|-style="background:#fcc;"
| 69
| May 10
| @ Portland
| 
| Augustin, Olynyk (21)
| Kenyon Martin Jr. (9)
| Jae'Sean Tate (9)
| Moda Center1,939
| 16–53
|-style="background:#fcc;"
| 70
| May 12
| @ L. A. Lakers
| 
| Brooks, Olynyk (24)
| Kenyon Martin Jr. (10)
| Khyri Thomas (11)
| Staples Center4,087
| 16–54
|-style="background:#cfc;"
| 71
| May 14
| L. A. Clippers
| 
| Olynyk, Tate (20)
| Martin Jr., Olynyk (9)
| Kelly Olynyk (11)
| Toyota Center3,803
| 17–54
|-style="background:#fcc"
| 72
| May 16
| @ Atlanta
| 
| Augustin, Brooks (18)
| Cameron Oliver (12)
| Augustin, Tate (5)
| State Farm Arena3,045
| 17–55

Player statistics

After all games.

|-
| ≠
| 20 || 6 || 20.8 || .424 || .386 || .907 || 2.2 || 3.9 || .4 || .0 || 10.6
|-
| ≠
| 17 || 5 || 23.0 || .314 || .270 || .833 || 2.3 || 1.9 || .8 || .1 || 5.2
|-
| ≠
| 20 || 5 || 26.0 || .406 || .382 || .583 || 3.4 || 1.5 || .6 || .3 || 11.2
|-
| 
| 51 || 14 || 24.1 || .448 || style=background:#000000;color:white;|.423 || .806 || 4.4 || 1.4 || .7 || .2 || 8.2
|-
| ‡
| 6 || 0 || 6.0 || .471 || .000 || .500 || 2.3 || .2 || .0 || .3 || 2.8
|-
| ‡
| 25 || 11 || 20.2 || .376 || .336 || .746 || 7.6 || 2.4 || .8 || .7 || 9.6
|-
| 
| 27 || 13 || 29.2 || .433 || .329 || .825 || 2.1 || 2.6 || .5 || .5 || 17.8
|-
| †
| 8 || 8 || 36.3 || .444 || .347 || .883 || 5.1 || 10.4 || .9 || .8 || 24.8
|-
| 
| 36 || 23 || 25.9 || .404 || .346 || .651 || 3.7 || 1.9 || .6 || .4 || 8.8
|-
| ‡
| 13 || 3 || 20.1 || .413 || .282 || 1.000 || 3.2 || 1.2 || .6 || .5 || 4.9
|-
| ‡
| 26 || 1 || 11.8 || .412 || .359 || .614 || 2.0 || 1.5 || .2 || .0 || 5.8
|-
| †
| 11 || 0 || 6.8 || .238 || .133 || .500 || 1.0 || .4 || .5 || .4 || 1.2
|-
| ≠
| 24 || 3 || 17.3 || .390 || .324 || .857 || 2.9 || 1.0 || .3 || .2 || 5.5
|-
| 
| 45 || 8 || 23.7 || .509 || .365 || .714 || 5.4 || 1.1 || .7 || .9 || 9.3
|-
| ‡
| 32 || 4 || 16.8 || .357 || .331 || .719 || 2.1 || .9 || .6 || .1 || 7.4
|-
| 
| 30 || 9 || 22.6 || .486 || .270 || .691 || 3.9 || 1.0 || 1.0 || .7 || 9.2
|-
| †
| 20 || 20 || 33.5 || .407 || .320 || .783 || 4.8 || 5.0 || 1.2 || .5 || 21.2
|-
| ≠
| 4 || 0 || 21.8 || style=background:#000000;color:white;|.576 || .308 || .250 || 5.3 || 1.3 || .5 || 1.0 || 10.8
|-
| ≠
| 27 || 24 || 31.1 || .545 || .392 || .844 || 8.4 || 4.1 || 1.4 || .6 || 19.0
|-
| ‡
| 13 || 6 || 19.0 || .414 || .265 || .750 || 3.8 || 1.1 || .9 || 1.1 || 5.4
|-
| ≠
| 26 || 23 || 32.1 || .426 || .311 || .734 || 3,8 || 6.3 || .7 || .3 || 16.6
|-
| ≠
| 2 || 0 || 17.0 || .313 || .250 || .000 || 2.5 || 1.0 || .0 || .0 || 6.5
|-
| ‡
| 2 || 0 || 9.5 || .500 || .000 || .000 || 2.0 || .0 || .0 || 1.0 || 2.0
|-
| 
| style=background:#000000;color:white;|70 || style=background:#000000;color:white;|58 || 29.2 || .506 || .308 || .694 || 5.3 || 2.5 || 1.2 || .5 || 11.3
|-
| ‡
| 4 || 0 || 6.0 || .286 || .167 || .714 || 1.0 || 1.0 || .3 || .3 || 2.5
|-
| ≠
| 5 || 2 || 30.6 || .485 || .333 || style=background:#000000;color:white;|1.000 || 3.6 || 5.0 || style=background:#000000;color:white;|1.8 || style=background:#000000;color:white;|1.2 || 16.4
|-
| †
| 32 || 32 || 30.0 || .366 || .314 || .783 || 3.6 || 4.6 || .9 || .6 || 4.4
|-
| 
| 40 || 40 || 32.2 || .404 || .317 || .749 || 3.2 || style=background:#000000;color:white;|6.9 || 1.1 || .8 || 20.6
|-
| ≠
| 23 || 1 || 14.3 || .416 || .339 || .696 || 3.8 || .9 || .4 || .5 || 6.1
|-
| 
| 41 || 41 || style=background:#000000;color:white;|32.3 || .514 || .374 || .631 || style=background:#000000;color:white;|9.6 || 1.7 || .8 || style=background:#000000;color:white;|1.2 || style=background:#000000;color:white;|21.0
|}
‡Waived during the season
†Traded during the season
≠Acquired during the season

Transactions

Trades

Free agency

Re-signed

Additions

Subtractions

Awards 
Jae'Sean Tate was the only player to have been named to an all-NBA team as an All-Rookie First Team Player.

References

Houston Rockets seasons
Houston Rockets
Houston Rockets
Houston Rockets